The 1991 Cantabrian regional election was held on Sunday, 26 May 1991, to elect the 3rd Regional Assembly of the autonomous community of Cantabria. All 39 seats in the Regional Assembly were up for election. The election was held simultaneously with regional elections in 12 other autonomous communities and local elections all throughout Spain.

The Spanish Socialist Workers' Party (PSOE) under incumbent President Jaime Blanco went on to win its first and only regional election in Cantabria. Juan Hormaechea's Union for the Progress of Cantabria (UPCA), a split from the People's Party (PP), won 15 seats and 33% of the vote, with the PP vote collapsing to 6 seats and 14% of the vote as a result. The Regionalist Party of Cantabria (PRC) suffered from the UPCA's surge and returned to its 1983 results, while the Democratic and Social Centre did not reach the required 5% threshold and was expelled from parliament.

Juan Hormaechea managed to get re-elected as regional President thanks to a UPCA-PP agreement. He had been forced to resign in late 1990, after a no-confidence motion was passed against him by an alliance of PSOE, PP, PRC and CDS.

Overview

Electoral system
The Regional Assembly of Cantabria was the devolved, unicameral legislature of the autonomous community of Cantabria, having legislative power in regional matters as defined by the Spanish Constitution and the Cantabrian Statute of Autonomy, as well as the ability to vote confidence in or withdraw it from a President of the Regional Deputation. Voting for the Parliament was on the basis of universal suffrage, which comprised all nationals over 18 years of age, registered in Cantabria and in full enjoyment of their political rights.

The 39 members of the Regional Assembly of Cantabria were elected using the D'Hondt method and a closed list proportional representation, with an electoral threshold of five percent of valid votes—which included blank ballots—being applied regionally.

The electoral law provided that parties, federations, coalitions and groupings of electors were allowed to present lists of candidates. However, groupings of electors were required to secure the signature of at least 1 percent of the electors registered in Cantabria. Electors were barred from signing for more than one list of candidates. Concurrently, parties and federations intending to enter in coalition to take part jointly at an election were required to inform the relevant Electoral Commission within ten days of the election being called.

Election date
The term of the Regional Assembly of Cantabria expired four years after the date of its previous election. Legal amendments earlier in 1991 established that elections to the Regional Assembly were to be fixed for the fourth Sunday of May every four years. The previous election was held on 10 June 1987, setting the election date for the Parliament on Sunday, 26 May 1991.

The Regional Assembly of Cantabria could not be dissolved before the date of expiry of parliament except in the event of an investiture process failing to elect a regional President within a two-month period from the first ballot. In such a case, the Regional Assembly was to be automatically dissolved and a snap election called, with elected deputies merely serving out what remained of their four-year terms.

Background
The 1987 election had seen AP candidate Juan Hormaechea win the election with 19 out of 39 seats, 1 short for the absolute majority. Hormaechea, who had been Mayor of Santander between 1974 and 1987 and stood as an independent within AP, was elected as President of Cantabria thanks to the abstention vote of the CDS two deputies.

However, from the beginning Hormaechea's tenure as regional President was controversial. Shortly after being elected, in August 1987, Hormaechea announced "difficulties" in forming a regional government, claiming pressures from AP to force him to name prominent party members as regional ministers, accusing AP of "seeking to create wealth for themselves instead of wanting to serve the region" and threatening to resign from his office. The government crisis was temporarily solved with the naming of three independents and four AP members as regional ministers.

Hormaechea would star another incidents throughout the legislature, including insults to other parties' deputies, accusations to the Assembly Speaker Eduardo Obregón (PSOE) of official misconduct (which resulted in a legal complaint against Hormaechea), as well as accusations from the three opposition parties (PSOE, PRC and CDS) of a continued disregard for the regional chamber. Hormaechea was also accused of political misconduct, such as extorting other deputies in exchange of their votes, bribing MPs from other parties, as well as influence peddling favoring family members and physically attacking a PSOE senator.

Further, in late 1989, a controversy arose after Hormaechea declared he was not supporting the People's Party, successor party to AP, for that year's general election. From that point, the deteriorating relationship between the PP and Hormaechea as a result of the latter's personalism and marginalization of the party's structure in the region triggered a political crisis. Hormaechea's insults to party leaders in late 1990 motivated the PP's decision not to choose him as candidate for the incoming 1991 election, as well as the party presenting a motion of censure on Hormaechea to remove him from the regional government, with the support from the PSOE, PRC and CDS, electing PSOE leader Jaime Blanco as the head of a coalition administration for the remainder of the legislature. This caused a split within the regional PP, with 12 deputies supporting Hormaechea and 7 supporting the no-confidence motion against him. Hormaechea's grouping went on to form a separate party, the Union for the Progress of Cantabria (UPCA), to stand for the 1991 election.

Campaign
The unveiling of irregularities within the finances of Hormaechea's government conducted by Blanco's coalition government marked the electoral campaign into the 1991 election. Hormaechea's management of the regional budget had left a public debt worth of 80,000 million pesetas, while auditors discovered expenditures during the 1987-1990 period that were difficult to justify, with evidence pointing to embezzlement during Hormaechea's tenure.

The Spanish Socialist Workers' Party (PSOE) tried to benefit from the split in the centre-right vote, with former Deputy Prime Minister Alfonso Guerra asking conservative voters to vote the PSOE "for this time", reminding the chaotic political situation of the community as a result of the infighting between former President Juan Hormaechea and the People's Party leadership.

Opinion polls
The table below lists voting intention estimates in reverse chronological order, showing the most recent first and using the dates when the survey fieldwork was done, as opposed to the date of publication. Where the fieldwork dates are unknown, the date of publication is given instead. The highest percentage figure in each polling survey is displayed with its background shaded in the leading party's colour. If a tie ensues, this is applied to the figures with the highest percentages. The "Lead" column on the right shows the percentage-point difference between the parties with the highest percentages in a poll. When available, seat projections determined by the polling organisations are displayed below (or in place of) the percentages in a smaller font; 20 seats were required for an absolute majority in the Regional Assembly of Cantabria.

Results

Aftermath

Government formation

1993 motion of no confidence

1994 motion of no confidence

1994 failed investiture attempts

Notes

References
Opinion poll sources

Other

1991 in Cantabria
Cantabria
Regional elections in Cantabria
May 1991 events in Europe